Events from the year 1693 in Ireland.

Incumbent
Monarch: William III and Mary II

Events
February 1 – the 8th King's Royal Irish Hussars are raised by Colonel Henry Conyngham as Conyngham's dragoons.
March 9 – the House of Commons of England presents an address to King William III complaining of mismanagement of Irish affairs. The Lord Lieutenant of Ireland, Viscount Sydney, is recalled on 13 June and administration left in the hands of Lords Justices.
Huguenot cemetery, Dublin, is established.

Arts and literature
Vertue rewarded, or The Irish princess, an early romance novel set in Clonmel during the Williamite War in Ireland, is published in London.

Births
August 13 – Gustavus Handcock, politician (d. 1751)

Deaths

January – Edward FitzGerald-Villiers, soldier (b. c. 1654)
July 19 (July 29, New Style) – John Barrett, soldier, killed in the French service at the Battle of Landen.
August 21 – Patrick Sarsfield, 1st Earl of Lucan, Jacobite and soldier (b. c. 1660)
Peter French, Dominican missionary and theologian.

References

 
Years of the 17th century in Ireland
1690s in Ireland
Ireland